The Dodge Crusader is an automobile built by Dodge Canada. Initially introduced in 1951, the original Crusader was a rebadged Plymouth Cambridge fitted with a long-block  flathead-six engine. For 1954, the Crusader nameplate was switched to a rebadged version of the Plymouth Plaza, and it remained in production until 1958.

References

Cars of Canada
Crusader